Heavens Fall is a 2006 American film based on the Scottsboro Boys incident of 1931.

Plot 
In the film, two young white women (portrayed by Leelee Sobieski and Azura Skye) accuse nine black youths of rape in the segregated South. Timothy Hutton stars as criminal defense attorney Samuel Leibowitz.
The film begins after the first trial of the nine in the bustling city of Scottsboro, Alabama. Samuel Leibowitz, a successful Jewish lawyer from New York is called down past the Mason–Dixon line to defend the nine black youths.

Cast 
 Timothy Hutton ... Samuel Leibowitz 
 David Strathairn ... Judge James E. Horton
 Leelee Sobieski ... Victoria Price 
 Anthony Mackie ... William Lee 
 Bill Sage ... Thomas Knight, Jr.
 Azura Skye ... Ruby Bates 
 James Tolkan ... Thomas Knight, Sr. 
 Bill Smitrovich ... George Chamlee 
 Maury Chaykin ... Lyle Harris 
 Joseph Lyle Taylor ... Joseph Brodsky
 B. J. Britt ... Haywood Patterson
 Francie Swift ... Belle Leibowitz

Production 
A train from the Tennessee Valley Railroad Museum was used in the filming.

Release 
Heavens Fall was released on DVD in the US in 2007.

See also
 Timeline of the civil rights movement

External links
 
 
 

2006 films
2006 crime drama films
American crime drama films
Films about miscarriage of justice
Crime films based on actual events
Films set in Alabama
Films set in 1931
Films about racism
African-American drama films
2000s English-language films
2000s American films